The Eagle River is a stream,  long, in the borough of Wrangell in the U.S. state of Alaska. Heading at Eagle Lake in the Coast Mountains, it flows northwest through part of the Tongass National Forest into Eagle Bay on the Bradfield Canal. Near the midpoint of its course, the river passes through Little Eagle Lake. On the shore opposite Eagle Bay and the Eagle River mouth, the Harding River enters Bradfield Canal.

Recreation
The United States Forest Service manages a public-use cabin, accessible only by floatplane, at Eagle Lake. Eagle Lake supports a population of "trophy" coastal cutthroat trout.

Although the cabin is open year-round, lake ice may prevent floatplanes from landing. Amenities are minimal and do not include electricity or drinking water. Hunters as well as fishers sometimes rent the cabin.

Major game fish in the Eagle River itself include pink and chum salmon, and Dolly Varden char, as well as coastal cutthroat trout. These fish are accessible by boat traveling upriver from the mouth.

Renters of this cabin sometimes fish along the Eagle River or hunt for waterfowl on its tidal flats.

See also
 List of rivers of Alaska

References

External links
Harding River Cabin – Recreation.gov

Rivers of Wrangell, Alaska
Rivers of Alaska